Ramiro Enrique Paz (born 4 May 2001) is an Argentine professional footballer who plays as a forward for Orlando City of Major League Soccer.

Club career

Banfield
Enrique progressed through the youth ranks of Banfield. On 25 July 2019, he signed his first professional contract; penning terms for three years. He was promoted to the club's senior squad under manager Javier Sanguinetti at the beginning of 2021, having only previously been called up to train with them and featuring in a friendly in October 2020 against Talleres. On 12 February 2021, he made his senior professional debut, entering as a 73rd-minute substitute for Luciano Pons in a 2–0 victory over Racing Club in the 2021 Copa de la Liga Profesional group stage. He scored his first senior goal in the same competition, the equaliser of a 2–2 draw with Estudiantes (LP) on 5 April 2021.

Orlando City
On 26 January 2023, Enrique signed for Orlando City of Major League Soccer on a three-year contract with two additional club option years. He was rostered under the MLS U22 initiative. He made his debut for the club on 26 February 2023, replacing Ercan Kara in the 63rd minute of a 1–0 win over the New York Red Bulls.

International career
Enrique received call-ups at under-18 level from Argentina in 2019.

Personal life
Enrique is the son of 1986 FIFA World Cup winner Héctor Enrique. His uncle, Carlos, also played professional football. He also has two brothers, Fernando and Facundo, who are also sportsmen; in football and rugby, respectively.

Career statistics
.

References

External links
 

2001 births
Living people
People from Burzaco
Sportspeople from Buenos Aires Province
Argentine footballers
Argentina youth international footballers
Association football forwards
Argentine Primera División players
Major League Soccer players
Club Atlético Banfield footballers
Orlando City SC players
Argentine expatriate footballers
Expatriate soccer players in the United States
Argentine expatriate sportspeople in the United States
Enrique family